Laudadio Rambaldo (late 14th century) was an Italian painter active in Ferrara, also known as Rambaldo di Ferrara. According to Lanzi, flourished about 1386 and painted in the Church of the Servi at Castel Tedaldo.

References

14th-century Italian painters
Italian male painters
Painters from Ferrara
Year of death unknown
Year of birth unknown